is a retired Japanese football player.

Club career stats
Updated to 23 February 2019.

References

External links
Profile at Machida Zelvia

1986 births
Living people
Hosei University alumni
Association football people from Tokyo
Japanese footballers
J1 League players
J2 League players
J3 League players
Omiya Ardija players
Oita Trinita players
FC Machida Zelvia players
Association football midfielders